Ghatkopar (Officially, MasterCard Ghatkopar), is a metro station and the eastern terminus of Line 1 of the Mumbai Metro serving the Ghatkopar suburb of Mumbai, India. It was opened to the public on 8 June 2014. Ghatkopar is the busiest station on Line 1, with a daily passenger traffic of 94,053 in February 2017.

History
The Mumbai Metropolitan Region Development Authority (MMRDA) acquired a 1,400 square metre plot near the Ghatkopar railway station for construction of the Ghatkopar metro station. The MMRDA initially believed that the land belonged to the Brihanmumbai Municipal Corporation (BMC). While the metro was being constructed, the CR wrote letters to the MMRDA informing them that the land actually belonged to CR. After CR submitted documents proving the same, the MMRDA agreed to compensate them for the plot. At a meeting between MMRDA and CR officials in April 2014, it was agreed that the former would pay  for acquiring the land as part of an inter-governmental agency deal. However, some CR officials were reportedly upset as the amount was far lower than the market value of the land. As per market trends at the time, the land was estimated to be worth .

Infrastructure
In March 2017, MMOPL completed the installation of LED lights at the station. The replacement of the station's 1,718 lamps with LED lights halved its energy consumption. Only lamps were replaced; fixtures were not.

There are 7 sets of automated fare collection (AFC) gates at Ghatkopar station. Three more will be installed by the end of June 2014. The station has textured tiles intended to provide grip to commuters who use wheelchairs. The station also has an elevator wide enough to accommodate a wheelchair, and a ramp from road level up to the elevator, enabling access for the disabled.

Station layout

Foot overbridge
The Ghatkopar station is connected with the western side of the Ghatkopar railway station through a 12-meter-wide foot overbridge (FOB). Commuters who want to exit the metro station from the main gate must purchase a platform ticket to cross the FOB and reach the road.

Although the Central Railway (CR) had initially permitted metro commuters to use the FOB as a goodwill gesture around two weeks after the metro's opening, they announced that commuters found using the FOB without a platform ticket or a railway pass would be fined. A CR official told Mid-Day, "We have seen the flow of passengers and we think that our local train passengers are facing a problem because of the sudden rush of Metro passengers. Therefore we are now insisting that Metro passengers buy tickets to use the railway-owned overbridge." Railway Pravasi Sangh President Subhash Gupta told the paper, "I am aware of this issue and also took it up in the meeting with railway officials. The railway FOB here can't take the burden of thousands of additional Metro passengers. The rush has increased manifold after Metro services started."

References

Mumbai Metro stations
Railway stations in India opened in 2014
2014 establishments in Maharashtra